Peter Whiting is a former football (soccer) goalkeeper who represented New Zealand at international level.

Whiting played two official A-international matches for the All Whites in 1962 against visitors New Caledonia, the first a 4–1 on 2 June 1962, his second a 4–2 win on 4 June. They were to be his only official matches as New Zealand played no other official matches until 1967.

References

Year of birth missing (living people)
Living people
New Zealand association footballers
New Zealand international footballers
Association football goalkeepers